Chang Ya-chung (born December 1954) is a Taiwanese political scientist. Chang subsequently became an active member of the Kuomintang, contesting the party's 2019 presidential primary. He was deemed an ineligible candidate for the party's 2020 leadership election, placing second in the following year.

Academic career
Chang earned doctorates from National Chengchi University and the University of Hamburg. He taught at Nanhua University until 2003 and is now a professor at National Taiwan University.

Political career
The alliance was backed by laborers. The organization demonstrated against several of Chen Shui-bian's policies, namely legislative approval of a weapons procurement deal with the United States, and amendments to the Constitution of the Republic of China pertaining to the powers of the National Assembly. In 2005, Chang was elected to the National Assembly representing the Democratic Action Alliance, but resigned on the first day of meetings to protest the National Assembly's formation, as it was convened solely to consider constitutional amendments proposed by the Legislative Yuan that led directly to the National Assembly's suspension. The amendments passed with support from the Kuomintang and Democratic Progressive Party. In 2006, Chang and the Democratic Action Alliance asked that the Kuomintang initiate recall proceedings against party member Hsu Tsai-li, who had been found guilty of corruption while serving as mayor of Keelung. 

Following the election of Ma Ying-jeou to the presidency in 2008, Chang drafted a "Basic Agreement on Peaceful Cross-Strait Development" to be negotiated with China, published in the Journal of Current Chinese Affairs in 2010. Chang helped organize the Taipei Forum in 2012 to discuss Cross-Strait relations. That same year, Chang was appointed to a government committee to develop new guidelines for high school history textbooks. He also worked as an adviser to three textbook publishing companies. Chang has served as an aide to Hung Hsiu-chu and advised her 2016 presidential campaign. He received credit for developing Hung's "one China, same interpretation" Cross-Strait policy. Chang's own view on Cross-Strait relations has been described as "." The school was founded in March 2017, and Chang was named its president. Chang said later that year that the Sun Yat-sen School would field its own candidates to participate in Kuomintang primaries for local office. The Sun Yat-sen School worked with the 800 Heroes veterans' organization and the National Civil Servant Association, among others, to petition in support of a question regarding pension reductions on the 2018 Taiwanese referendum. 

In January 2019, Chang announced that he would be contesting the Kuomintang's nomination for the 2020 presidential election. He finished fifth of five candidates in the 2019 Kuomintang presidential primary won by Han Kuo-yu.

Following Han's loss in the presidential election, Kuomintang chairman Wu Den-yih announced his intention to resign. Before Wu had formally stepped down, Chang became the first to announce his candidacy for the 2020 Kuomintang chairmanship election. Because he had not yet served on the Kuomintang's Central Committee or Central Review Committee, Chang's candidacy was ruled ineligible. In February 2021, the KMT announced that a proposal to appoint Chang to the Central Advisory Committee would be considered during the 21st National Congress. Chang ran in the 2021 Kuomintang chairmanship election, finishing second to Eric Chu.

References

1954 births
Living people
Taiwanese political scientists
Kuomintang politicians in Taiwan
University of Hamburg alumni
National Chengchi University alumni
Academic staff of the National Taiwan University
Taiwanese expatriates in Germany